A dance card or programme du bal (also known by its German-language name, Tanzkarte) is used by a woman to record the names of the men with whom she intends to dance each successive dance at a formal ball.

History
Dance cards appear to have originated in the 18th century, but their use first became widespread in 19th-century Vienna, especially at the large balls during Fasching before Lent.

A dance card is typically a booklet with a decorative cover, listing dance titles, composers, and the person with whom the woman intended to dance. Typically, it would have a cover indicating the sponsoring organization of the ball and a decorative cord by which it could be attached to a lady's wrist or ball gown. From the 19th century until World War I, dance cards for the elite of Austria-Hungary were often very elaborate, with some even incorporating precious metals and jewels.

Modern times
In modern times the expression "dance card" is often used metaphorically, as when someone says "pencil me into your dance card," meaning "find some time to spend with me". Conversely, claiming one's "dance card is full" implies that even though they may be interested, they have no time for another person.

Air crews
U.S. Air Force aircrews in general, and those involved in flight tests in particular, use the term to describe the first card in a "deck" of flight or test maneuver cards. The "dance card" contains administrative data about the mission, aircraft, and aircrew as well as a list of the maneuvers to be flown. The card serves as a table of contents for the mission and a quick reference for the aircrew's use during the flight.

Pictures

References

External links

Examples of dance cards from the 19th century at The Aroostook County Historical and Art Museum

Balls (dance party)
Dance culture
Ephemera